Defective On Arrival is an alternate interpretation of "D.O.A", which stands for "dead on arrival", a term used in medical context and with the alternative colloquial/trade meaning of "At the moment of receiving the item, it was damaged or defective to the point of not being usable". It is frequently used for expliciting a kind of warranty when a customer buys an item that can't be checked before pay, and at the moment of make an RMA.

References